Don Alphonsus Ciacconius (born shortly before 15 December 1530, Baeza - died 14 February 1599, Rome) was a Spanish Dominican scholar in Rome. His name is also spelt as Alfonso Chacón and Ciacono. Chacón is known mainly for two of his works: Historia utriusque belli dacici a Traiano Caesare gesti (Rome, 1576), and Vitae, et res gestae pontificum romanorum et S.R.E. Cardinalium ab initio nascentis ecclesiae usque ad Clementem IX. P.O.M. Alphonsi Ciaconii Ordinis Praedicatorum & aliorum opera descriptae (Rome, 1601).

Works

Chacón was an expert on ancient Graeco-Roman and Paleo-Christian epigraphy, the Medieval paleography and manuscripts, besides the history of the papacy.

He named the tinctures after their Latin initials. Or (gold) was designated by A (aurum), argent (silver) or white, respectively by a (argentum), azure (blue) with c (caeruleus), gules (red) by r (rubeus), and vert (green) by v (viridis). Though the sign for sable (black) (niger) was not present in his system traditionally it was designated by the black colour itself.

Prophecy of the Popes controversy
The Benedictine historian Arnold Wyon (1554–ca. 1610) attributed to Chacón the interpretations of the pre-1590 prophecies in the Prophecy of the Popes attributed to St. Malachy. The prophecy, including the attribution of the interpretations to Chacón, was first published in 1595 by Wion as part of his book Lignum Vitæ. But this attribution to Chacón was refuted in 1694 by Claude-François Menestrier, who pointed out that the prophecies are never mentioned in the original 1601 edition of Chacón's Lives of the Popes and Cardinals, nor in the later editions of 1630 and 1677 that included much new material by later authors, and that neither were his alleged interpretations of the alleged prophecies mentioned as part of his works when they were very comprehensively listed (including his unpublished works) in both Nicolás Antonio's bibliography of Spanish writers, and Fr Ambroise de Altavera's bibliography of Dominican writers.

See also
Tricking (heraldry)

Notes

References

External links
 Orazio and Artemisia Gentileschi, a fully digitized exhibition catalog from The Metropolitan Museum of Art Libraries, which contains material on Alphonsus Ciacconius (see index)
 Vitae et res gestae pontificum romanorum et S.R.E. Cardinalium ab initio nascentis ecclesiae usque ad Clementem IX. P.O.M. Alphonsi Ciaconii Ordinis Praedicatorum & aliorum opera descriptae
 

1530 births
1599 deaths
Spanish heraldists
16th-century Spanish Roman Catholic theologians
Spanish Dominicans
Historians of the Catholic Church
16th-century Spanish philosophers